Life Technologies Corp. v. Promega Corp., 580 U.S. ___ (2017), was a case in which the United States Supreme Court clarified the application of the Patent Act of 1952 to the sale of components of patented inventions in foreign markets. In an opinion written by Associate Justice Sonia Sotomayor, the Court held that the sale of a "single component" in a foreign market "does not constitute a substantial portion of the components that can give rise to liability under [the Patent Act of 1952]." Justice Samuel Alito wrote an opinion concurring in part and concurring in the judgment, in which he was joined Justice Clarence Thomas. Chief Justice John Roberts took no part in the decision of the case.

See also
 List of United States Supreme Court cases
 Lists of United States Supreme Court cases by volume
 List of United States Supreme Court cases by the Roberts Court

References

External links
 

United States patent case law
United States Supreme Court cases
United States Supreme Court cases of the Roberts Court
2017 in United States case law